The 2006–07 Israeli Women's Cup (Gvia HaMedina Nashim) was the 9th season of Israel's women's nationwide football cup competition.

The competition was won, for the 5th consecutive time, by Maccabi Holon who had beaten ASA Tel Aviv University 2–0 in the final.

Results

First round
Out of 7 planned matches, 6 weren't played, as clubs forfeited their matches.

Quarter-finals

Semi-finals

Final

References
Source
2006–07 State Cup Women Israeli Football Association 
Notes

Israel Women's Cup seasons
Cup
Israel